Water UK is the trade association representing the water companies of the United Kingdom. Its chief executive is Christine McGourty.

References 

Trade associations based in the United Kingdom
Water supply and sanitation in the United Kingdom